The Røros Copper Works at Røros in Trøndelag, Norway operated from 1644 to 1977. Privileges from the Crown were given in 1647, including rights to forests and water resources within a circle of diameter 90 kilometers. The local farmers were given working obligations, such as transport and charcoal production for the copper works. Among the mines were the Storwartz mines, Hestkletten, Christianus Qvintus, Olavsgruven, Kongens Gruve and Christianus Sextus. During its operation a total of 110,000 tons of copper and 525,000 tons of pyrites was produced.

Geology
This region consists of Cambro-Silurian sedimentary rocks (i.e., rocks from the Cambrian, Ordovician and Silurian formed 545 to 417 million years before the present) that are highly metamorphosed by the Caledonian orogeny 490 to 390 million years ago (Ma). The mountain formation created extensive folding with numerous anticlines and synclines across much of Norway. In addition to Cambrosilurian shales, there are numerous volcanic intrusive sills and dikes. Metal deposits are formed by hydrothermal interaction of fluids between volcanic and surrounding rocks, concentrating copper sulfates in ore zones.

References

1644 establishments in Norway
1977 disestablishments in Norway
Copper smelters
Copper mining companies of Norway
History of Trøndelag